The Hatch Solar Energy Center is a 5.88 MWp (5.0 MWAC) photovoltaic power station.
It was built by Blattner Energy using 84 dual-axis trackers and Amonix 7700 concentrator photovoltaics (CPV) panels, each of which contains 7,560 fresnel lens to concentrate sunlight 500 times onto multijunction photovoltaic cells. It was the largest CPV facility in North America when it was completed in 2011.  
The facility was subsequently repowered with SunPower panels that use high-efficiency monocrystalline silicon cells without concentration.
The output is being sold to El Paso Electric, under a 25 year power purchase agreement (PPA).
 
Annual electricity production is expected to be about 11,000 MW·h/year.

Electricity production

See also

 Alamosa Solar Generating Project
 List of photovoltaic power stations
 Renewable energy in the United States
 Solar power in New Mexico
 Solar power in the United States

External links
 Photo gallery

References

Energy infrastructure completed in 2011
Solar power stations in New Mexico
Photovoltaic power stations in the United States
NextEra Energy